Germany competed at the 2020 Summer Olympics in Tokyo. Originally scheduled to take place from 24 July to 9 August 2020, the Games were postponed to 23 July to 8 August 2021, because of the COVID-19 pandemic. It was the nation's eighth consecutive appearance at the Summer Olympic Games after its reunification in 1990.

Germany competed in all sports except artistic swimming, baseball, rugby sevens, softball and water polo.

Germany's medal total of 37 medals is the lowest number won by Germany at a Summer Olympics post-reunification.

Medalists

| width="78%" align="left" valign="top" |

| width="22%" align="left" valign="top" |

Competitors
The following is the list of number of competitors in the Games. Note that reserves in field hockey, football, and handball are not counted:

Archery

Three German archers qualified for the women's events by reaching the quarterfinal stage of the women's team recurve at the 2019 World Archery Championships in 's-Hertogenbosch, Netherlands. Another German archer finished among the top four vying for qualification of the men's individual recurve to book an outright Olympic berth available at the 2021 European Championships in Antalya, Turkey.

Athletics

German athletes further achieved the entry standards, either by qualifying time or by world ranking, in the following track and field events (up to a maximum of 3 athletes in each event):

Track & road events
Men

Women

Mixed

Field events
Men

Women

Combined events – Men's decathlon

Combined event – Women's heptathlon

Badminton

Germany entered five badminton players (three men and two women) into the Olympic tournament based on the BWF Race to Tokyo Rankings; one entry each in the men's and women's singles and a pair in the men's and mixed doubles.

Basketball

Summary

Men's tournament

The German men's basketball team qualified for the Olympics by winning the Olympic Qualifying Tournament in Split, Croatia.

Team roster

Group play

Quarterfinal

Boxing

Germany entered three boxers (two men and one woman) into the Olympic tournament. Chechnya-born Hamsat Shadalov (men's featherweight), Ammar Abduljabbar (men's heavyweight), and Nadine Apetz (women's welterweight) secured the spots on the German squad in their respective weight divisions, either by winning the round of 16 match, advancing to the semifinal match, or scoring a box-off triumph, at the 2020 European Qualification Tournament in London and Paris.

Canoeing

Slalom
German canoeists qualified one boat for each of the following classes through the 2019 ICF Canoe Slalom World Championships in La Seu d'Urgell, Spain and the 2021 European Canoe Slalom Championships in Ivrea, Italy. The slalom canoeists, highlighted by London 2012 medalists and two-time Olympians Hannes Aigner (men's K-1) and Sideris Tasiadis (men's C-1), were named as part of the nations' second batch of nominated athletes on 1 June 2021.

Sprint
German canoeists qualified a total of six boats in each of the following distances for the Games through the 2019 ICF Canoe Sprint World Championships in Szeged, Hungary.

The sprint canoeists were officially named as part of the nation's third batch of nominated athletes on 15 June 2021, with the reigning champion Sebastian Brendel adding more golds to his canoe sprint career in his third Olympics and four-time medalist Ronald Rauhe leading the squad to his remarkable sixth Games.

Men

Women

Qualification Legend: FA = Qualify to final (medal); FB = Qualify to final B (non-medal)

Cycling

Road
Germany entered a squad of eight riders (four per gender) to compete in their respective Olympic road races, by virtue of their top 50 national finish (for men) and top 22 (for women) in the UCI World Ranking.

Men

Women

Track
Following the completion of the 2020 UCI Track Cycling World Championships, German riders accumulated spots for both men and women in team sprint, team pursuit, and madison, as well as the men's omnium, based on their country's results in the final UCI Olympic rankings. As a result of their place in the men's and women's team sprint, Germany won its right to enter two riders in both men's and women's sprint and men's and women's keirin.

Deutscher Olympischer Sportbund (DOSB) announced the full track cycling squad, as part of the third batch of nominated German athletes, on 15 June 2021, with triple medalist Maximilian Levy racing along the sprint track in his fourth consecutive Games.

Sprint

Team sprint

Qualification legend: FA=Gold medal final; FB=Bronze medal final

Pursuit

Keirin

Omnium

Madison

Mountain biking
German mountain bikers qualified for two men's and two women's quota places into the Olympic cross-country race, as a result of the nation's seventh-place finish for each gender, respectively, in the UCI Olympic Ranking List of 16 May 2021.

BMX
Germany received two quota spots for BMX at the Olympics, as a result of the nation's runner-up finish for the women's freestyle and a top-two placement eligible for qualification in the women's race at the 2019 UCI BMX World Championships.

Freestyle

Diving

German divers qualified for five individual spots and three synchronized teams at the Games through the 2019 FINA World Championships and the 2021 FINA Diving World Cup. Seven divers (four men and three women), highlighted by Rio 2016 bronze medalist and three-time Olympian Patrick Hausding (men's springboard and men's synchronized springboard), were named as part of the third batch of nominated German athletes on 15 June 2021.

Men

Women

Equestrian

German equestrians qualified a full squad each in the team dressage, eventing, and jumping competitions by virtue of a top-six finish at the 2018 FEI World Equestrian Games in Tryon, North Carolina, United States.

Dressage
The German dressage team was named on 27 June 2021. Helen Langehanenberg and Annabelle have been named the travelling alternates.

Qualification Legend: Q = Qualified for the final; q = Qualified for the final as a lucky loser

Eventing
The German eventing team was named on 21 June 2021. Andreas Dibowski and Corrida have been named the travelling alternates.

Jumping
The German jumping team was named on 3 July 2021. Maurice Tebbel and Don Diarado have been named the travelling alternates and will be entered for the team jumping.

Fencing

German fencers qualified a full squad in the men's team sabre by finishing among the top four nations in the FIE Olympic Team Rankings, while the men's foil team claimed the spot, as the highest-ranked nation from Europe outside the world's top four. Leonie Ebert (women's foil) booked an additional place on the German team as one of the two highest-ranked fencers vying for qualification from Europe in the FIE Adjusted Official Rankings.

The fencing teams were officially named as part of the second batch of nominated athletes to the Olympic roster on 1 June 2021, with Peter Joppich (men's foil) and Max Hartung (men's sabre) leading the fencers to their third consecutive Games.

Men

Women

Field hockey

Summary

Men's tournament

Germany men's national field hockey team qualified for the Olympics by securing one of the seven tickets available and defeating Austria in a playoff at the Mönchengladbach leg of the 2019 FIH Olympic Qualifiers.

Team roster

Group play

Quarterfinal

Semifinal

Bronze medal game

Women's tournament

Germany women's national field hockey team qualified for the Olympics by securing one of the seven tickets available and defeating Italy in a playoff at the Mönchengladbach leg of the 2019 FIH Olympic Qualifiers.

Team roster

Group play

Quarterfinal

Football

Summary

Men's tournament

Germany men's football team qualified for the Games by advancing to the semi-final stage of the 2019 UEFA European Under-21 Championship in Italy.

Team roster

Group play

Golf

Germany entered two male and two female golfers into the Olympic tournament. Maximilian Kieffer and Hurly Long qualified among the top 60 eligible players for the men's event after Martin Kaymer and Stephan Jäger withdrew.

Gymnastics

Artistic
Germany fielded a full squad of four gymnasts in each the women's and men's artistic gymnastics events by finishing in the top nine nations eligible for qualification in the team all-around at the 2019 World Artistic Gymnastics Championships in Stuttgart. The members of both teams were announced on 13 June 2021.

Men
Team

Individual finals

Women
Team

Individual finals

Handball

Summary

Men's tournament

Germany men's national handball team qualified for the Olympics by securing a top-two finish at the Berlin leg of the 2020 IHF Olympic Qualification Tournament.

Team roster

Group play

Quarterfinal

Judo
 
Germany has qualified a squad of 13 judokas (seven men and six women) for each of the following weight classes at the Games by virtue of their top 18 finish in the IJF World Ranking List of 28 June 2021.

Men

Women

Mixed

Karate
 
Germany entered four karateka into the inaugural Olympic tournament. 2018 world champion Jonathan Horne qualified directly for the men's kumite +75-kg category by finishing among the top four karateka at the end of the combined WKF Olympic Rankings. Meanwhile, Noah Bitsch (men's 75 kg) and Jasmin Jüttner (women's kata) secured places on the German squad in their respective weight categories by finishing among the top four in the final pool round of the 2021 World Qualification Tournament in Paris, France.

Kumite

Kata

Modern pentathlon
 
German athletes qualified for the following spots in the modern pentathlon at the Games. Rio 2016 Olympian Patrick Dogue and two-time veteran Annika Schleu confirmed one of the eight Olympic places available each in the men's and women's event, respectively, through the 2019 European Championships in Bath, England. Meanwhile, Janine Kohlmann and Fabian Liebig were automatically selected among the top nine modern pentathletes eligible for qualification in their respective individual events based on the UIPM World Rankings of 14 June 2021.

Rowing

Germany qualified seven boats for each of the following rowing classes into the Olympic regatta, with the majority of crews confirming Olympic places for their boats at the 2019 FISA World Championships in Ottensheim, Austria. Meanwhile, the women's double sculls boat was awarded to the German roster with a top-two finish at the 2021 FISA Final Qualification Regatta in Lucerne, Switzerland.

Twenty-seven rowers (20 men and 7 women) were officially selected as part of the nation's third batch of nominated athletes on 15 June 2021, including Rio 2016 champions Hans Gruhne (men's quadruple sculls) and two-time Olympian Annekatrin Thiele (women's double sculls).

Men

Women

Qualification Legend: FA=Final A (medal); FB=Final B (non-medal); FC=Final C (non-medal); FD=Final D (non-medal); FE=Final E (non-medal); FF=Final F (non-medal); SA/B=Semifinals A/B; SC/D=Semifinals C/D; SE/F=Semifinals E/F; QF=Quarterfinals; R=Repechage

Sailing

German sailors qualified one boat in each of the following classes through the 2018 Sailing World Championships, the class-associated Worlds, and the continental regattas.

Philipp Buhl became the first German sailor to be selected to the Olympic team, following his gold-medal victory in the Laser class at the 2020 Worlds in Melbourne, Australia. Skiff crews Tina Lutz and Susann Beucke (49erFX), along with Rio 2016 bronze medalists Erik Heil and Thomas Plößel, secured their country's Olympic spots at the Kiel Week regatta, while Svenja Weger and the Nacra 17 crew (Kohlhoff & Stuhlemmer) scored a top-ten placement at their respective individual-fleet Europeans to lock the spots on the German sailing roster for the rescheduled Games. The women's 470 crew (Wanser & Winkel) rounded out the selection at the 2021 Worlds in Vilamoura, Portugal.

Men

Women

Mixed

M = Medal race; EL = Eliminated – did not advance into the medal race

Shooting

German shooters achieved quota places for the following events by virtue of their best finishes at the 2018 ISSF World Championships, the 2019 ISSF World Cup series, European Championships or Games, and European Qualifying Tournament, as long as they obtained a minimum qualifying score (MQS) by 31 May 2020.

The pistol shooters, led by the defending Olympic champion Christian Reitz (men's rapid fire pistol) and Rio 2016 silver medalist Monika Karsch (women's sport pistol), were named as part of the first batch of nominated German athletes for Tokyo 2020 on 19 May 2021. Rifle markswoman Jolyn Beer, air pistol shooter Carina Wimmer, and trap shooter Andreas Löw, who earned a direct place as the highest-ranked shooter vying for qualification in the men's trap based on the ISSF World Olympic Rankings, joined the shooting squad on 15 June 2021.

Men

Women

Mixed

Skateboarding

Germany entered two skateboarders (one per gender) to compete across all events at the Games. Tyler Edtmayer and Lilly Stoephasius were automatically selected among the top 16 eligible skateboarders in the men's and women's park, respectively, based on the World Skate Olympic Rankings of 30 June 2021.

Sport climbing

Germany entered two sport climbers into the Olympic tournament. Alexander Megos qualified directly for the men's combined event, by advancing to the final and securing one of the seven provisional berths at the 2019 IFSC World Championships in Hachiōji, Japan. Meanwhile, Jan Hojer finished in the top six of those eligible for qualification at the IFSC World Qualifying Event in Toulouse, France, earning a quota place and joining with Megos on the German roster.

Surfing

Germany sent one surfer to compete in the men's shortboard at the Games. Leon Glatzer scored a top-two finish within his heat to book one of the five available places at the 2021 ISA World Surfing Games in El Salvador.

Swimming

German swimmers further achieved qualifying standards in the following events (up to a maximum of 2 swimmers in each event at the Olympic Qualifying Time (OQT), and potentially 1 at the Olympic Selection Time (OST)): Because of the consequent effects brought by the COVID-19 pandemic, the German Swimming Federation (DSV) released a revised policy to select the country's best swimmers for the rescheduled Games: the top four of each individual event at the 2019 Worlds while also fulfilling the federation's mandated standards; those who attained the federation's qualifying standards between 1 January to 31 March 2020, and those who attained the federation's qualifying standards at an approved meet during the remaining time frame.

Thirty swimmers (17 men and 13 women) were officially named to the German roster on 19 May 2021, including 2019 world champion Florian Wellbrock in both the men's long-distance freestyle and open water, 2015 world champion Marco Koch in the men's 200 m breaststroke, 2019 world silver medalist Sarah Köhler in the women's long-distance freestyle, and two-time Olympian Annika Bruhn in the women's sprint and middle-distance freestyle.

Men

Women

Mixed

Table tennis

Germany entered six athletes into the table tennis competition at the Games. The men's and women's teams secured their respective Olympic berths by winning the gold medal each at the 2019 European Games in Minsk, Belarus, permitting a maximum of two starters to compete each in the men's and women's singles tournament, as well as the inaugural mixed doubles.

The men's and women's table tennis teams were officially named as part of the nation's first batch of nominated athletes for the Games on 19 May 2021, with Timo Boll leading the players to his sixth consecutive Games. Notable players also included four-time medalist Dimitrij Ovtcharov and Rio 2016 silver medalists Han Ying, Petrissa Solja, and Shan Xiaona.

Men

Women

Mixed

Taekwondo

Germany entered one athlete into the taekwondo competition at the Games. 2017 world champion Alexander Bachmann qualified directly for the men's heavyweight category (+80 kg) by finishing among the top five taekwondo practitioners at the end of the WT Olympic Rankings.

Tennis

Germany entered six tennis players (four men and two women) into the Olympic tournament. Top ranked player Alexander Zverev (world no. 6), Jan-Lennard Struff (world no. 45), Dominik Koepfer (world no. 53) and Philipp Kohlschreiber (world no. 128) were selected for the eligible players in the men's singles based on the ATP world rankings of 14 June 2021. Rio 2016 Olympian Laura Siegemund (world no. 55) selected for the women's singles as two into the top 58 players based on WTA rankings of 14 June 2021.

Having already qualified in singles, both Struff and Zverev have competed together in doubles, while Kevin Krawietz and Tim Pütz agreed to compete together. Siegemund is partnering with Anna-Lena Friedsam in the women's doubles.

Men

Women

Mixed

Triathlon

Germany qualified four triathletes (two per gender) for the following events at the Games by finishing among the top seven nations in the ITU Mixed Relay Olympic Rankings.

Individual

Relay

Volleyball

Beach
Three German beach volleyball teams (one men's and two women's) qualified directly for the Olympics by virtue of their nation's top 15 placement in the FIVB Olympic Rankings of 13 June 2021.

Weightlifting

Germany qualified three weightlifters for each of the following classes into the Olympic competition. Simon Brandhuber (men's 61 kg) and Rio 2016 Olympian Nico Müller secured one of the top eight slots each in their respective weight divisions based on the IWF Absolute World Ranking. On 17 June 2021, International Weightlifting Federation banned Romania to compete at the Games because of multiple doping cases; therefore, Lisa Schweizer sealed the vacant berth as the next highest-ranked weightlifter vying for qualification in the women's 64 kg category.

Wrestling

Germany qualified seven wrestlers for each of the following classes into the Olympic competition. Five of them finished among the top six to book Olympic spots in the men's Greco-Roman (67, 87 and 130 kg) and women's freestyle (68 and 76 kg) wrestling at the 2019 World Championships, while two additional licenses were awarded to the German wrestlers, who progressed to the top two finals of the men's freestyle 125 kg and men's Greco-Roman 60 kg at the 2021 European Olympic Qualification Tournament in Budapest, Hungary.

Freestyle

Greco-Roman

References

Nations at the 2020 Summer Olympics
2020
2021 in German sport